BioStor is a free-to-access archive of biodiversity-related scientific papers, in the Biodiversity Heritage Library. It was created and is operated by Roderic Page.

References

External links 
 

Biodiversity databases
Online archives of the United Kingdom